Oxhey is a suburb of Watford, under the jurisdiction of the Watford Borough Council of the county of Hertfordshire, England. It is in the Oxhey Ward of Watford Borough Council.

Oxhey grew during the mid-19th century with the coming of the London and Birmingham Railway from London Euston to Boxmoor in 1837, the settlement being developed to house railway workers. The line was completed to Birmingham in 1838. It was originally called 'New Bushey', after the well-established village a mile away, but was renamed 'Oxhey' in 1907.

Oxhey's parish church is St Matthew's, a Grade II listed building dating from 1880 in Gothic Revival style with some elements of early Art Nouveau decoration. The church also features a Karl Parsons window in the Lady Chapel.

Oxhey Grange in Oxhey Lane was built in 1876 by architect William Young (1843-1900) in the High Victorian Gothic style. It is a Grade II listed building.

The wider locations which comprise the modern Oxhey area are Oxhey Village (the area around Bushey station and between Pinner Road and London Road), Oxhey Hall (the area along Hampermill Lane towards Moor Park) and South Oxhey, although this is really a suburb in itself which is adjacent to Oxhey. It is an oddity that the main line station, which serves both Oxhey and the town of Bushey a mile away, is situated on the edge of Oxhey Village and yet is called Bushey Station. The original name of the station was 'Bushey', it was renamed 'Bushey & Oxhey' when Oxhey Village was renamed, and was then renamed again in 1974.

Civil parish 
In 1931 the parish had a population of 2636. In 1894 the parish of Bushey was split into "Bushey Rural" and "Bushey Urban", on 1 April 1906 Bushey Rural was renamed "Oxhey".

Sport & Leisure
Oxhey has a non-League football team Oxhey Jets F.C. who play at the Boundary Stadium.

Oxhey Park Golf Club is a public pay & play course that used to be an 18-hole course built on land owned by the Blackwell family in 1910, who then sold the estate to London County Council in 1946, who made it a municipal course in 1947 with a par of 78, but it was closed in 1954. Now just a 9-hole course, it has got some nice features on its layout.

References

External links
Oxhey Village Environment Group http://www.oveg.org

Populated places in Hertfordshire
Former civil parishes in Hertfordshire
Watford